Clark Wallace Thompson (August 6, 1896 – December 16, 1981) was born in La Crosse, Wisconsin on August 6, 1896, and moved to Oregon in 1901 with his parents, who settled in Cascade Locks. Thompson attended the common schools and the University of Oregon at Eugene. He enlisted in the United States Marine Corps during the First World War serving from 1917–1918. He remained a United States Marine Corps reservist until 1946 except when he again served on active duty during World War II from 1940–1942.

On November 16, 1918, he married Libbie Moody, daughter of William Lewis Moody, Jr. of Galveston, Texas. Thompson served as treasurer of the American National Insurance Company and was a Democratic member of the House of Representatives from the 7th district of Texas from 1933 to 1935, having been elected to fill the vacancy caused by the death of United States Representative Clay Stone Briggs. He later represented the Texas's 9th district from 1947 until he retired in 1966. He was one of the majority of the Texan delegation to decline to sign the 1956 Southern Manifesto opposing the desegregation of public schools ordered by the Supreme Court in Brown v. Board of Education. However, Thompson voted against the Civil Rights Acts of 1957 and 1960, as well as the 24th Amendment to the U.S. Constitution, while voting present on the Civil Rights Act of 1964 and not voting on the Voting Rights Act of 1965.

Thompson died on December 16, 1981, in Galveston, Texas and was buried in Galveston Memorial Park Cemetery.

References

External links

1896 births
1981 deaths
People from Galveston, Texas
Politicians from La Crosse, Wisconsin
Democratic Party members of the United States House of Representatives from Texas
20th-century American politicians